A Life Within a Day is the only studio album by the musical project Squackett, featuring English musicians  Chris Squire (Yes) and Steve Hackett (ex-Genesis). It was released on 28 May 2012, although it had been written and recorded a few years earlier. The title track, "A Life Within a Day" won the 'Anthem' award at the 2012 Progressive Music Awards. The song "Aliens" was first written as a Yes song titled "Aliens (Are Only Us from the Future)" which was performed during the first leg of Yes's In the Present world tour, but had never been released on an album.

Three decades earlier, Hackett had worked with Squire's Yes bandmate Steve Howe in the band GTR.

The project name Squackett is a portmanteau of "Squire" and "Hackett". The artwork on the album cover that resembles a Chinese character is the word Squackett written using Square Word Calligraphy, written by artist Xu Bing.

An edition that includes a DVD containing a 5.1 surround sound version of the album was released on 5 June 2012.

Hackett performed "Stormchaser" during the first part of his 2009 tour with his band, which stands as the only performance of Squackett material to date.

Track listing
All songs by Steve Hackett, Chris Squire and Roger King, except where noted.

Personnel
Musicians
 Chris Squire – bass, vocals
 Steve Hackett – guitars, harmonica, vocals
 Roger King – keyboards
 Jeremy Stacey – drums
 Amanda Lehmann – backing vocals

String players on "Life Within a Day"
 Christine Townsend – viola, violin
 Richard Stewart – cello
 Dick Driver – double bass

Production
 Roger King – producer, programming
 Xu Bing – cover image
 Jon Brewer – licensing
 Mark Powell – project coordinator
 Vicky Powell – coordination
 Phil Smee – artwork, design
 Angéla Vicedomini – photography
 Maurizio Vicedomini – photography

References

2012 debut albums
Progressive rock albums by British artists
Chris Squire albums
Steve Hackett albums
Esoteric Recordings albums